The Lent Bumps 2023 were a set of rowing races at Cambridge University from Tuesday 7 March 2023 to Saturday 11 March 2023. The event was run as a bumps race and was the 129th set of races in the series of Lent Bumps which have been held annually in late February or early March since 1887. This was the first edition of Lents to have more women's crews competing than men's crews.

As a result of high water levels and a strong stream, all races due to be held on Friday were cancelled, and the M4/W4, M3, and W3 divisions were cancelled on the Saturday. All crews affected were given technical rowovers in the official results.

Head of the River crews
  rowed over on all four days to retain the men's headship they held in 2022.

Highest 2nd VIIIs

References 

Lent Bumps results
2023 in English sport